Leiostyla cassida is a species of small, air-breathing land snail, a terrestrial pulmonate gastropod mollusks in the family Lauriidae.

This species is endemic to Portugal. This species is mentioned in Annexes II and IV of the Habitats Directive.

This is one of several species sometimes referred as the Madeiran land snail.

References

Molluscs of Europe
Leiostyla
Endemic fauna of Madeira
Taxonomy articles created by Polbot